Chatsworth Peak is a peak in the Simi Hills overlooking (to the east) Chatsworth and the western San Fernando Valley, in Los Angeles, Southern California.  It is southwest of Santa Susana Pass and north of the Chatsworth Reservoir.

Nearby are Simi Peak in the western Simi Hills, and Oat Mountain in the Santa Susana Mountains.

See also
Santa Susana Pass State Historic Park
Index: Simi Hills

References

External links 
 

Simi Hills
Mountains of Ventura County, California
Geography of the San Fernando Valley
Mountains of Southern California